George Aarons (born Gregory Podubisky; 1896 in St. Petersburg, Russia – 1980 in Gloucester, Massachusetts) was a sculptor who lived and taught in Gloucester, Massachusetts, for many years until his death in 1980. He designed Gloucester's 350th Anniversary Commemorative Medal.

Aarons moved from Russia to the United States when he was ten. His father was a merchant.  He began taking drawing classes during evenings at Dearborn Public School in Boston as a teenager and went on to study at the Boston Museum of Fine Arts in 1916.  Aarons later moved to New York City to study with Jo Davidson, and other Paris-trained masters at the Beaux-Arts Institute. He eventually returned to the Boston area and established studios in Brookline and Gloucester, Massachusetts. During his lifetime, he was recognized internationally and won several prestigious awards.

Aarons had studios in Brookline, Massachusetts and Gloucester, Massachusetts where he produced large bronze and marble figures and wood carvings. He produced several projects for the Works Progress Administration including a group of three figures for the Public Garden (Boston), a longshoreman, fisherman and foundry worker, as well as a large relief (1938) for the South Boston Housing Project and façade of the Baltimore Hebrew Congregational Building (1956).

His works are at the Museum of Art in Ein Harod, Israel; Fitchburg Art Museum in Massachusetts, Musée de St. Denis in France; Hilles Library at Radcliffe College in Cambridge, Massachusetts; and Hillel House at Boston University in Massachusetts. He produced five

He did reliefs for Siefer Hall at Brandeis University in Waltham, Massachusetts (1950); Edward Filene (the founder of Filene's Department Store and a philanthropist) on the Boston Common; Fireman's Memorial in Beverly, Massachusetts; a memorial to Mitchell Frieman in Boston; the U.S. Post Office in Ripley, Mississippi; and at the Cincinnati Telephone Building; the Combined Jewish Philanthropies building in Boston (1965); and a commemorative medal for the 350th Anniversary of the City of Gloucester, Massachusetts (1972).

In the summer of 2003, the North Shore Arts Association of Gloucester held an exhibition of his work, and following is information that the North Shore Arts Association gathered for that exhibition.

Characteristic of his era, George Aarons was among the foreign-born American sculptors of the early 20th century who started their careers as academicians and evolved into modernists and increasingly abstract artists.

Over thirty pieces spanning the length of this sculptor's career were featured in this exhibition, including work in various medium bronze, wood and original plasters. Like his contemporaries, Aarons experimented with direct carving in wood, and he was one of the few academically trained sculptors who consistently cut his own works in marble. His early work was classically inspired figurative work, along with sensitive portraits. Some of his most powerful sculpture comes from his middle period, when he worked through his emotional pain following the global realization of the Jewish Holocaust. He depicted humanity deep anxiety over this tragedy with figures that are at once symbolically charged and movingly beautiful. Aarons late work consists of radically simplified forms that continue to reference the human form and often are carved directly in wood and stone.

Aarons summered and taught classes on Cape Ann for many years before moving to Gloucester full-time with his wife about 1950. While Aarons is best known locally for his domestic-scale works, he also executed numerous monumental, public commissions that can be found throughout the United States in cities such as Washington, D.C.; Baltimore, Maryland; and Cincinnati, Ohio; as well as in France and Israel.

As noted in a Gloucester Daily Times Article, Aarons wanted his sculptures to honor the struggles and nobility of people and rail against the evil done against them. And that was why, even as his work grew more and more abstract, stylized and simplified, he never left behind the form of the human figure that had been his focus from his earliest works.

"I think he's trying to connect to your humanity. He wants you to be able to look at a piece and identify with it and feel basic human emotions that he values and also that he wants you to experience because he sees something as wrong in the world and the only way something's going to happen is if you're sympathetic," says Rebecca Reynolds of Rockport, who organized the current retrospective exhibit of sculpture by the late Gloucester artist at the North Shore Arts Association's hall on Pirates Lane off East Main Street in Gloucester.

Aarons told the Gloucester Daily Times in September 1954 that he found it hard to remember at just what age he started studying art, but he recalled that the nude model had to partially dress when he was in class because he was so young. He initially studied painting and drawing at the museum school, but he once said he became fascinated by sculpture when he met an established sculptor at the Copley Society in Boston who invited Aarons to his studio and offered him some clay to "play around" with.

After he graduated, he apprenticed under sculptors Richard Brooks, Robert Baker and Solon Borglum. He worked as a carpenter, shipbuilder, dishwasher and chimney sweep. He fashioned architectural decorations, including figures for fountains and now and then a few commissioned portraits. He returned to Boston by the early 1920s and began to exhibit his own works and get commissions for portraits, fountains and reliefs.

His sculptures from this time are dreamy and romantic in the realistic, academic style of the time. A painted portrait of the young Aarons that is included in the North Shore Arts Association exhibit shows a determined fellow with dark brown hair, a suit and bow tie. However, in 1922, this determined young artist was living with his parents on Calder Street in Dorchester.

In the 1930s, Aarons adopted the streamlined, monumental style of the socialist works of the time. Aarons made money, as he would all his life, from commissions, selling his personal work and teaching sculpture, but the Depression of the 1930s was tough for everyone.

So Aarons found work though the federal Works Progress Administration, one of Franklin Roosevelt's New Deal programs. He received his first major commission when he was asked to create a public sculpture for the South Boston Harbor Village public housing project around 1937. He was elevated to the position of supervisor for the project and received a corresponding $5 pay increase to make his weekly salary $32. The raise convinced him he was fit to marry and he proposed to Gertrude Band, an attractive brunette dancer whom he had been dating for more than a year. They were married before the Harbor Village project was dedicated on Labor Day 1938.

Aarons' design featured a brawny, larger-than-lifesize fisherman, longshoreman and a laborer flanked by a boy and girl at either end to portray the children who would live in the apartments. Aarons elected to do the piece in cast stone to employ carpenters and laborers as well as craftsman for a total of 10 men.

"That really made his career," Reynolds says of the sculpture. "It got a lot of national attention because it was one of the first federally-funded housing projects. So it got a lot of press. And it was a really monumental piece. It was really right for the time. ... You're coming out of the Depression. It was a work that really celebrated the common people and offered optimism and hope."

However, the sculpture began being vandalized not long after its completion and was removed a decade later.

In 1940, Gertrude and George bought an old barn in Brookline, where George set up his studio, with living quarters above. He taught students, mostly women, in the studio, but he was also busy with his own work.

"George was a very small guy, very friendly, very warm, loved little kids," said his brother-in-law Spartico Monello of Rockport. "...He was very outgoing. ... He loved to hug all the girls."

Gertrude gave up dancing after their marriage. She helped with the bookkeeping and helped promote George's sculpture career. The couple had the same political beliefs and desire for justice for oppressed people. They never had any children. The couple began visiting Gloucester during summers around 1945. At first they camped in West Gloucester. Later they rented a room in a cottage on Eastern Avenue.

"We didn't come here because there were other artists here. We came because we loved this part of the country," Aarons said.

In his sculpture, Aarons focused more and more on the theme of oppressed people as he worried about the spread of fascism and Nazism during the 1930s, World War II and after. He had done pieces during the mid-1930s about the oppression of African-Americans, including "Negro Head," which is in the North Shore Art Association retrospective. After the war, he also delved into Jewish themes and became increasingly known as an important Jewish artist, leading to commissions from Jewish organizations across the country and abroad.

"He gets into raw emotion. Some people describe him as an expressionist because of the emotion (in his work)," Reynolds says.

An example of this is Aaron's depiction of the prophet Jeremiah from 1945, which is on display at the Cape Ann Historical Museum in Gloucester. His Jeremiah is a bearded man striding forward, holding a book in one hand while his other hand is bent back over his head as he prepares to strike with his long staff.

"You look at this man and you know he's an angry scholar," Reynolds says. "...The line and the force about it. He's not a man of violence, but he has these strong beliefs and that's propelling him forward, through his chest and his heart, it's all propelling him forward to protect his people."

But Aarons, also sculpted sensual sexual nudes, like Adolescence of 1948, also at the Cape Ann Historical Museum and several in the North Shore Art Association retrospective.

Aarons' sculptures grew increasingly stylized. He depicted people beaten down and writhing in pain, but he focused more and more on the abstract shape and structure of pieces. He often retained the shape of the original block of wood, marble or limestone in the finished pieces.

George and Gertrude bought a pony barn on Eagle Road in East Gloucester in the 1950s, which George turned into a summer camp and studio. The home eventually became their year-round residence. From the couple's living room, they could see the ocean.

"George always looked for a barn because of the skylight. And any place we lived nearly all the space was devoted to his studio and sculpture," Gertrude said in 1972.

In 1953, Aarons received a commission to carve a series of reliefs into limestone blocks on the facade of the Baltimore Hebrew Congregation in Maryland.

"This project is the culmination of my career," Aarons told the Gloucester Times in 1954, when he was still working on the project. "It hasn't a touch of commercialism even though it is a commissioned work. I have been working as all true artists hope to work eventually, that is expressing my own beliefs in my own manner and having the outcome accepted and appreciated."

The most remarkable part of the work is his depiction of the Ten Commandments in two tall tablets. He symbolized the first five, which deal with people's duties to God, with a group of flames climbing up the tablet. He symbolized the next five commandments, which deal with people's duties to each other, with a clod-like texture across the tablet.

Aarons was not a religious man, despite the Jewish subjects in his work, says Spartico Monello.

"I am essentially interested in humanity," Aarons wrote in 1956 letter, "and have a sympathetic feeling and consciousness of the process man must experience to achieve his aspirations: the suffering, the struggle, the pleasures and pains. I try to express these things in as forceable and interesting a manner as it is within my power to do so. The spirit of my expression is more important than the style or form it takes."

"Work that's all there is to do. I'm convinced. That's the only way to spend your time," Aarons told the Gloucester Times in 1967.

In 1979, Gertrude would recall that George "could never get away from his work even though he was his own boss and no one was driving him. He would have his breakfast and go into his studio. At 9 in the morning he was there. He would come in for lunch. Then he would be back to work. He loved it. He loved what he was doing. People who love what they are doing are people who find so much meaning in life."

Aarons sculptures filled the Eagle Road barn until he put one small building behind it and, in 1971, another. He displayed his work outside in the garden between the buildings.

He often worked on three or four pieces, in different stages of completion, at once in the studio behind his Eagle Road house. He developed ideas in clay sketches before executing final pieces in wood, stone or metal. His clothes were often full of clay and plaster. He was still teaching students in his Brookline studio during the winters in the late 1960s.

"I have so much to learn," Aarons said then. "I learn from the young, my students. ... I love the young. I love to hear them to hear what they are doing just to have them around. The young are experimenting. I think we are going to get a lot from their work. Most people don't like to change, especially older people. The young can change."

His work grew ever more abstract and angular. His subjects included motherhood, couples and religious themes. "Duo" from 1962, which is included in the North Shore Arts Association retrospective, depicts a man and woman locked in a jagged embrace with their heads and groins fused together.

"My development starts with everyday life, which affects me, I would say, in a personal or worldly way," Aarons told the Gloucester Times in 1970. "As soon as you become divorced from life, you are dead. Life disturbs me, especially the present-day trend all over the world leading to chaos. Feelings of dejection and hopelessness run through me in cycles. I talk in wood, stone or bronze."

By then, he'd become an old man with a whisk-broom mustache, bulbous nose, sad eyes and thinning white hair. His statue of Thomas Jefferson decorated the office of the secretary of the treasury in Washington, D.C. His memorial to Edward A. Filene sat in Boston Common. He was commissioned by the city of Gloucester to design a medal to commemorate the city's 350 anniversary in 1972. He had exhibited at the Boston Museum of Fine Arts, Whitney Museum in New York, Dallas Museum of Art in Texas, Cleveland Museum of Art in Ohio, and Corcoran Gallery of Art in Washington, D.C. Locally, his works are on display at the Sawyer Free Library in Gloucester and Manchester Town Hall.

Aarons had a stroke in the mid-1970s that left him unable to speak. Gertrude kept to his side, but his declining health prevented him from being the artist he had been. Some old friends who had been students helped him with some sculptural work, but he seems to have done little after 1973. He died at Addison Gilbert Hospital in Gloucester on November 24, 1980, leaving behind Gertrude, who died in Gloucester on May 5, 1989.

In his eulogy for Aarons, Rabbi Sanford Shanblatt of Temple Israel in Swampscott said, "His genuine affection for people and his utter concern for life made him extraordinarily sensitive to the world about him. He was deeply pained by the suffering he saw about him in the world. War angered him, the suffering of others deeply affected him, violence was abhorrent to him, and man's inhumanity to man was to him the worst sin. But he did not merely shake his head at what he saw and sit back and do nothing. Rather, he expressed himself in great art; he put his thoughts into his sculpturing; he used his mind and his heart to show the world that the greatest good is human happiness, and the greatest goal is human brotherhood."

References

1896 births
1980 deaths
20th-century American sculptors
20th-century American male artists
American male sculptors
Emigrants from the Russian Empire to the United States